Matthew "Matt" Bobo (born January 6, 1977 in Des Moines, Iowa) is an American soccer player who last played for Carolina RailHawks in the North American Soccer League.

Career

College and Amateur 

Bobo attended the University of Wisconsin–Green Bay where he played on the men's soccer team in 1995 and 1996. In 1997, he transferred to Eastern Illinois University, where he was a First-Team All-Midwest and EIU's MVP as a senior.

In 1998, Bobo played for the Des Moines Menace in the USISL during the collegiate off season. In 1999 and 2000, he spent the seasons with the Chicago Sockers of the USL Premier Development League, winning the 1999 and 2000 league championships. In 2001, he moved to the Chicago Fire Reserves where he was a first team All Star.

Professional 

Bobo turned professional in 2001, and signed with the Milwaukee Rampage of the USL A-League. He remained with the Rampage through the 2002 season, winning the 2002 championship.  In 2003, he moved to the Richmond Kickers. In February 2006, Jason Smith announced that Bobo was to join the Atlanta Silverbacks. He has said of his move, "I think that the Silverbacks have a great organization and I'm looking forward to being a part of it."

After the insolvence from his club Atlanta Silverbacks joined on 24 March 2009 to Charleston Battery.

Bobo signed with Carolina RailHawks in February 2010. He was not listed on the club's roster for the 2011 season.

Personal life
Matt is married to former professional soccer player Krista Bobo (née Davey).

References

External links 

 Carolina RailHawks bio
 Charleston Battery bio
 Atlanta Silverbacks bio

1977 births
Living people
American soccer players
Atlanta Silverbacks players
Charleston Battery players
Chicago Fire U-23 players
Chicago Sockers players
Des Moines Menace players
Eastern Illinois Panthers men's soccer players
Association football defenders
Milwaukee Rampage players
North Carolina FC players
Sportspeople from Des Moines, Iowa
Richmond Kickers players
Soccer players from Iowa
USL League Two players
A-League (1995–2004) players
USL First Division players
USSF Division 2 Professional League players